Lee Jae-sung (born June 6, 1985) is a South Korean football player who is currently a free agent.

He has played for Chunnam Dragons.

References

External links 

1985 births
Living people
South Korean footballers
Jeonnam Dragons players
K League 1 players
Hanyang University alumni
Sportspeople from South Jeolla Province
Association football defenders